Kuleana is a Hawaiian word, defined in the Hawaii Electronic Library as a "Right, privilege, concern, responsibility, title, business, property, estate, portion, jurisdiction, authority, liability, interest, claim, ownership, tenure, affair, province; reason, cause, function, justification; small piece of property, as within an ahupuaʻa; blood relative through whom a relationship to less close relatives is traced, as to in-laws."

Kuleana Act of 1850
The Kuleana Act of 1850, proposed by the King in Privy Council passed by the Hawaii legislature created a system for private land ownership in seven parts.
Section 1 recognized ownership of government plots occupied and improved by families.  Section 2 expanded title to other types of land. Section 3 defined land boundaries and the ability to exchange portions of land. Section 4 established a system for the Hawaiian government to distribute larger parcels of land. Section 5 established the largest size of family owned lots. Section 6 attempted to distinguish between cultivated and waste lands.  Section 7 established access to roads, water sources, and other natural resources.

Contemporary examples
The Facebook founder and billionaire Mark Zuckerberg came under scrutiny in 2017 when he attempted to integrate property titles that had been established by the Kuleana Act into a  estate, which he intended to assemble in Hawaii by using quiet title lawsuits to establish the ownership of ambiguously-titled parcels of land.

See also 
 Kuleana rights
 Ahupuaʻa
 Ceded lands
 Great Māhele
 Aboriginal title in the United States

References

External links
Hawaii Electronic Library
Hoakalei Cultural Foundation

Hawaii statutes
History of Hawaii
Legal history of Hawaii
Real property law
1850 in law
1850 in Hawaii